Henry Carl Schadeberg (October 12, 1913 – December 11, 1985) was a member of the United States House of Representatives from Wisconsin from 19611965 and 19671971. He was a Republican. He represented Wisconsin's 1st congressional district in the 87th, 88th, 90th, and 91st United States Congresses.

Born in Manitowoc, Wisconsin, Schadeberg graduated from Lincoln High School, Manitowoc, Wisconsin. He earned a bachelor of arts degree in 1938 from Carroll College, Waukesha, Wisconsin and a bachelor of divinity degree in 1941 from Garrett Biblical Institute, Evanston, Illinois. He served as a chaplain in the United States Navy during World War II and the Korean War and then served in the U.S. Naval Reserve until his retirement, with the rank of captain, in 1969.

Following his departure from Congress, he resided in Rockbridge Baths, Virginia, until his death there on December 11, 1985.

See also
 List of members of the House Un-American Activities Committee

References

1913 births
1989 deaths
People from Manitowoc, Wisconsin
People from Rockbridge County, Virginia
Carroll University alumni
Garrett–Evangelical Theological Seminary alumni
Virginia Republicans
Republican Party members of the United States House of Representatives from Wisconsin
20th-century American politicians